Sandy MacMillan (born 1 July 1952) is a Canadian former sailor who competed in the 1976 Summer Olympics. He was a member of the youngest Olympic sailing crew at the 1976 Olympics, with fellow sailors Andreas Josenhans and Glen Dexter. The team placed 8th. The team went on to become the World Class Soling Champions in 1977 and 1980.

References

1952 births
Living people
Canadian male sailors (sport)
Olympic sailors of Canada
Sailors at the 1976 Summer Olympics – Soling
Soling class world champions